David Keith Clarence Bunn (born 9 April 1992) is a South African cricketer. He made his first-class debut on 2 February 2011, for Northerns against Western Province in the 2011-12 CSA Provincial 3-Day Challenge. Prior to his first-class debut, he was selected for South Africa's U19 squad to tour Zimbabwe. Bunn signed with Major League Cricket after moving to the United States and currently plays for the Bay Blazers in Minor League Cricket.

References 

1992 births
Living people
South African cricketers
American cricketers
People from Pretoria
Northerns cricketers